The Rapenburgwal is a secondary canal in Amsterdam in the east of the Amsterdam-Centrum district, in the Lastage neighborhood.

Location

The canal forms the northeast border of the island of Uilenburg. 
It is connected to Oudeschans and Uilenburgergracht, which delimit the northwest and the southeast of the island.
It is crossed in its center section by Bridge 281, Peperbrug, which connects Nieuwe Uilenburgerstraat on Uilenburg island to Peperstraat on Marken (Valkenburg) island.

A 1737 map shows that the canal once ran further east to the Markengracht, which was back-filled in 1968 during construction of the IJtunnel.

See also 
Canals of Amsterdam

Notes

Canals in Amsterdam